Amarsipus is the sole genus in the bagless glassfish family, Amarsipidae. It contains the single species Amarsipus carlsbergi, the amarsipa, which is a small and slender fish that lives in equatorial parts of the Indian and Pacific Oceans. It reaches   in standard length. Molecular phylogenetic analysis has placed this family in the Scombriformes within Pelagiaria; however, relationships between many pelagiarian lineages are poorly resolved and the nearest relatives of Amarsipidae remain unclear.

References

 
Perciformes genera
Monotypic ray-finned fish genera